General elections were held in the Bahamas on 10 January 1967. The result was a tie between the Progressive Liberal Party and the United Bahamian Party, both of which won 18 seats. In a reversal of the previous election (in which the PLP received the most votes but the UBP won the most seats), this time the PLP received a lower share of the vote than the UBP, but was able to form the country's first black-led government with the support of the sole Labour Party MP Randol Fawkes.

Results

Elected MPs

References

Bahamas
1967 in the Bahamas
Elections in the Bahamas
Bahamas
Election and referendum articles with incomplete results